Chigu (also Romanized as Chīgū and Chigoo) is a village in Manj Rural District, Manj District, Lordegan County, Chaharmahal and Bakhtiari Province, Iran. At the 2006 census, its population was 657, in 115 families.

References 

Populated places in Lordegan County